Marinko Koščec (born 1967 in Zagreb, Yugoslavia) is a Croatian writer.

Life and Work
Koščec studied English and French language and literature at the Faculty of Humanities and Social Sciences Zagreb,  graduated with diploma-thesis on Man in search of his double - the world seen through the work of J. M. G. Le Clézio (L'Homme en quête de son double – le monde vu à travers l’oeuvre de J. M. G. Le Clézio, 1992), then he continued his studies at the Ohio State University (1989) and the Institut Catholique de Paris (1990), obtained his magister degree with thesis on Figuration of the unsaid in the contemporary novel (Figuration du non-dit dans le roman contemporaine, 1995) at Diderot University Paris, and completed as PhD with thesis on Poetry of Michel Houellebecq. Narrative, stylistic and contextual study of opus (Poetika Michela Houellebecqa. Naratološka, stilistička i kontekstualna studija opusa, 2005) in Zagreb. Koščec is assistant professor of French literature at Department of Romance studies of the Faculty of Humanities and Social Sciences, and he also worked as freelance editor at SysPrint publishing from 2008 to 2011. He is author of seven novels, laureate of V.B.Z. Award 2003, and Croatian translator of the novels Whatever and Atomised, his novels A Handful of Sand and Centimetre of Happiness has been published in English (2013) and Dutch (2014) translation.

Bibliography
Otok pod morem (Island Under The Sea), Feral Tribune, Split 1999, .
Netko drugi (Someone else), Konzor, Zagreb 2001, .
Wonderland, VBZ, Zagreb 2003, .
To malo pijeska na dlanu (A Handful of Sand), Profil international, Zagreb 2005, .
Michel H. : mirakul, mučenik, manipulator? (Michel H.: Miraculus, martyr, manipulator?), Izdanja Antibarbarus,  Zagreb 2007, .
Centimetar od sreće (Centimetre of Happiness), Profil international, Zagreb 2008, .
Četvrti čovjek (The Fourth Man), Algoritam, Zagreb 2011, .
A Handful of Sand, Istros Books & Peter Owen Publishers, London 2013, .
Een centimeter vanaf het geluk (Centimetre of Happiness), KLIN, Amsterdam 2014, .
U potrazi za početkom kruga (In Pursuit of the Beginning of the Circle), Sandorf, Zagreb 2016,.

References

1967 births
Living people
Croatian novelists
Croatian translators
Literary translators
Translators from French
French–Croatian translators
Faculty of Humanities and Social Sciences, University of Zagreb alumni
Writers from Zagreb